Quirino Highway station is an under-construction Metro Manila Subway station located in Quirino Highway, Novaliches, Quezon City, Philippines. It is the second station for trains headed northbound towards the East Valenzuela station and the third station for trains headed southbound to the North Triangle Common Station.

Some of the station's closest landmarks include the NLEx Segment 8.1, Pacific Global Medical Center, and a Wilcon Depot.

History
In February 2019, the Department of Transportation signed a deal with the joint venture of Shimizu Corporation, Fujita Corporation, Takenaka Civil Engineering Co., Ltd., and EEI Corporation for the design and build contract for the first three stations of the Metro Manila Subway. One of those three stations is the Quirino Highway station. The DOTr then began clearing a site for the partial operability section of the Metro Manila Subway to initiate its construction. Construction of the station was delayed by the Covid-19 Pandemic, but it continued late 2021. Quirino Highway station is planned to be partially operational by 2025.

Transportation links
Jeepneys, taxis, and buses will be available around the station. It will also have access to buses going northbound and southbound along Mindanao Avenue because of a dedicated bus station outside the station. There are also tricycles near the area, especially within Quirino Highway and Marigold street.

References

Manila Metro Rail Transit System stations
Railway stations under construction in the Philippines